The Paulista School (Escola Paulista, São Paulo School) was an informal group of Brazilian architects who formed in the 1950s.  As opposed to the smoother curvy surfaces of the Rio (Carioca) School typified by Oscar Niemeyer, the Paulista work embraced exposed concrete structures, chunkier massing, and rougher finishes.

The two primary figures associated with the Paulista School are the Pritzker Prize-winner Paulo Mendes da Rocha and João Batista Vilanova Artigas; other figures include Joaquim Guedes and Oswaldo Bratke.

See also 
 Brutalist architecture

References

Architecture in Brazil